The Woman in the Case is a 1916 Australian silent film based on a popular play of the same name by Clyde Fitch.

It is considered a lost film.

Plot
Julian Rolfe has an affair with Clare Foster as a young man, but then settles down to marriage with Margaret. Clare tries to blackmail Julian but Margaret destroys the letters. Clare murders Julian's ward, Phillip, and tries to frame Julian for it. Julian is sentenced to death but Margaret manages to get Clare to confess.

Cast
Jean Robertson as Margaret Rolfe
Loris Bingham as Clare Foster
Fred Knowles as Julian Rolfe
Herbert J Bentley as Phillip Long
Winter Hall
David Edelsten
Austin Milroy

Production
George Willoughby had toured with the play though Australia in 1911 and 1912 to great success. Over 300 people were involved in making the movie.

Fred Knowles was an English actor touring Australia. After making the film he enlisted in the AIF and was wounded in France in May 1917, losing an arm. However he managed to resume his career.

Two other films were made from the same play, in 1916 and 1922 (as The Law and the Woman).

Release
The movie was trade screened in May 1916.

Willoughby later revived the play in 1927.

It was announced that the Willoughby Company were then to make The Pearl of the Pacific based on a story by Randolph Bedford, but this film appears to have never been made.

See also
The Woman in the Case

References

External links
 
 Text of original play

Australian black-and-white films
Lost Australian films
1916 films
1916 drama films
Australian drama films
Australian silent feature films
1916 lost films
Lost drama films
Silent drama films